This is a list of awards and nominations received by Australian actor Guy Pearce.

Major associations

Golden Globe Awards

Primetime Emmy Awards

Screen Actors Guild Awards

Industry awards

Australian Academy Film Awards

British Independent Film Awards

Gotham Awards

Logie Awards

Critics awards

Australian Film Critics Association

Boston Society of Film Critics

Chicago Film Critics Association

Online Film Critics Society

Phoenix Film Critics Society

San Diego Film Critics Society

Saturn Awards

References 

Lists of awards received by Australian actor